A number of symbols of Europe have emerged since antiquity, notably the mythological figure of Europa.
 
Several symbols were introduced in the 1950s and 1960s by the European Council. The European Communities created additional symbols for itself in 1985, which was to become inherited by the European Union (EU) in 1993. Such symbols of the European Union now represent political positions in support of EU policies and European integration as advocated by Europeans.

Europa and the bull

Europa was used as a geographical term, for one of the great divisions of the known world, by Herodotus (in a reduced geographical scope, referring to parts of Thrace or Epirus, also in the Homeric hymn to Apollo). It became the geographical term for the landmass west of the Tanais in the Roman-era geography by Strabo and Ptolemy.
Europa first began to be used in a cultural sense, denoting the territory of Latin Christendom, in the Carolingian period.

Europa is a feminine name, the name of a nymph in Hesiod, and in a legend first related by Herodotus, the name of a Phoenician noble-woman abducted by Greeks (in Herodotus' opinion, Cretans). The classical legend of Europa being abducted not by Greek pirates but by Zeus in the shape of a bull is told in Ovid's Metamorphoses. According to the account, Zeus took the guise of a tame white bull and mixed himself with the herds of Europa's father. While Europa and her female attendants were gathering flowers, she saw the bull, and got onto his back. Zeus took that opportunity and ran to the sea and swam, with her on his back, to the island of Crete. There he revealed his true identity, and Europa became the first queen of Crete. Zeus gave her a necklace made by Hephaestus and three additional gifts: Talos, Laelaps and a javelin that never missed. Zeus later re-created the shape of the white bull in the stars, which is now known as the constellation Taurus.

In addition to generally being a frequent motif in European art since Greco-Roman times, the founding myth of Europa and the bull has frequently been alluded to in relation to the continent and by the modern European Union, and can thus be considered not only a piece of toponymy, but also as a symbol, or national personification of Europe. For instance, statues of Europa and the bull are located outside several of the European Union's institutions, as well as on the Greek €2 coin. Europa's name appeared on postage stamps commemorating the Council of Europe, which were first issued in 1956. Furthermore, the dome of the European Parliament's Paul-Henri Spaak building contains a large mosaic by Aligi Sassu portraying the abduction of Europa with other elements of Greek mythology. The bull is also in the top-left corner of the new design of the residence permit card of all European Union countries.

Europa regina

Europa regina (Latin for Queen Europe) is the cartographic depiction of the European continent as a queen. Introduced and made popular during the mannerist period, Europa Regina is the map-like depiction of the European continent as a queen. Made popular in the 16th century, the map shows Europe as a young and graceful woman wearing imperial regalia. The Iberian peninsula (Hispania) is the head, wearing a crown shaped like the Carolingian hoop crown. The Pyrenees, forming the neck, separate the Iberian peninsula from France (Gallia), which makes up the upper chest. The Holy Roman Empire (Germania and other territories) is the centre of the torso, with Bohemia (sometimes Austria in early depictions) being the heart of the woman (alternatively described as a medallion at her waist). Her long gown stretches to Hungary, Poland, Lithuania, Livonia, Bulgaria, Muscovy, Macedonia and Greece. In her arms, formed by Italy and Denmark, she holds a sceptre and an orb (Sicily). In most depictions, Africa, Asia and the Scandinavian peninsula are partially shown, as are the British Isles, in schematic form.

The first map to depict Europe in this manner was made by Johannes Bucius Aenicola (1516–1542) in 1537. Though much about the origination and initial perception of this map is uncertain, it is known that Putsch maintained close relations with Holy Roman Emperor Ferdinand I of Habsburg, and that the map's popularity increased significantly during the second half of the 16th century. Europa Regina was introduced in the 1530s by the Austrian cartographer Johannes Putsch, possibly with the intent of depicting Europe as the spouse of Charles V of Habsburg, who aspired to become the universal monarch of Christendom and reigned over numerous realms including the Holy Roman Empire, Austrian lands, Burgundian territories, and the kingdom of Spain. Arguments in favour of this hypothesis are the westward orientation of the map to have Hispania as the crowned head, said to resemble the face of Charles V's wife, Isabella of Portugal; the use of the Holy Roman Empire's insignia – its Carolingian crown, sceptre and orb – and the portrayal of Habsburg realms (Austria, Bohemia, Hungary, Germany) as the heart and centre of the body; the design of the gown, which resembles the contemporary dress code at the Habsburg court. As in contemporary portraits of couples, Europa regina has her head turned to her right and also holds the orb with her right hand, which has been interpreted as facing and offering power to her imaginary husband, the emperor. More general, Europe is shown as the res publica christiana, the united Christendom in medieval tradition, and great or even dominant power in the world.

Another allegory is the attribution of Europe as the paradise by special placement of the water bodies. As contemporary iconography depicted the paradise as a closed form, Europa regina is enclosed by seas and rivers. The Danube river is depicted in a way that it resembles the course of the biblical river flowing through the paradise, with its estuary formed by four arms. That Europa regina is surrounded by water is also an allusion to the mythological Europa, who was abducted by Zeus and carried over the water. Europa regina belongs to the Early Modern allegory of Europa triumphans, as opposed to Europa deplorans.

Pater Europae

Charlemagne (King of the Franks from 768; Holy Roman Emperor c. 742814), also known as Charles the Great, is considered the founder of the French and German monarchies. Known as Pater Europae («Father of Europe»), he established an empire that represented the most expansive European unification since the fall of the Western Roman Empire and brought about a renaissance that formed a pan-European identity whilst marking the end of Late Antiquity. There was also a contemporary intellectual and cultural revival which profoundly marked the history of Western Europe. This gave Charlemagne a legendary standing that transcended his military accomplishments.

For many centuries, European royal houses sought to associate themselves with the Carolingian heritage. The crowns of the Holy Roman Empire and Napoleon Bonaparte were for instance both respectively named "The Crown of Charlemagne", and Charlemagne's personal sword, Joyeuse, served as a coronation sword for French kings from the 11th century onwards. The cult of Charlemagne was further embellished by the French renaissance author Jean Lemaire de Belges, who postulated that the emperor was part of an illustrious translatio imperii originating with King Priam of Troy during the Trojan Wars, and thus by extension Zeus, the "Father of Gods and men" in Greek Mythology.

Today, much of the pan-European, symbolic value of Charlemagne is attributed to the fact that he is considered an embodiment of the Franco-German friendship which was absent during the long-lasting enmity which culminated in the two world wars, but has become indispensable in the process of European integration. Thus, in the 1952 design competition for the Council of Europe's flag, several of the unsuccessful proposals were redolent of the Oriflamme; the banner given to Charlemagne by Pope Leo III at his coronation in the St. Peter's Basilica in the year 800. Similarities between Charlemagne's empire and the modern European integration were also suggested by professor Hans von Hentig the same year. The European Commission is also alluding to Charlemagne by means of naming one of its central buildings in Brussels after him (The Charlemagne building). The German city of Aachen has since 1949 annually awarded the Charlemagne Prize to champions of European unity, including Alcide De Gasperi, Jean Monnet and the euro itself. Each edition of the international affairs newspaper The Economist features a column called «Charlemagne's notebook», focusing on European Union affairs. In his speech at the award ceremony for the 2010 Charlemagne Youth Prize, European Parliament President Jerzy Buzek said the following:

Later monarchs who also have carried sobriquets as "relatives" of Europe include Queen Victoria of the United Kingdom (grandmother of Europe), Christian IX of Denmark and Nicholas I of Montenegro (both respectively father-in-law of Europe). These late 19th and early 20th century sobriquets are however purely on account of the marriage of these monarchs' offspring to foreign princes and princesses, and involve no wider symbolism.

Patron saints
There are six patron saints of Europe venerated in Roman Catholicism, five of them so declared by Pope John Paul II between 1980 and 1999:
Saints Cyril and Methodius, Saint Bridget of Sweden, Catherine of Siena and Saint Teresa Benedicta of the Cross (Edith Stein).
The exception is Benedict of Nursia, who had already been declared "Patron Saint of all Europe" by Pope Paul VI in 1964.

The whole of Europe in the 14th Century was consecrated under the protection of The Virgin Mary, mother of Jesus, as Our Lady of Europe. The devotion took place at the shrine in Gibraltar.

Flag

A "Flag of Europe" was introduced by the Council of Europe in 1955, originally intended as a "symbol for the whole of Europe", 
but due to its adoption by the European Economic Community (EEC) in 1985, and hence by the European Union (EU) as the successor organisation of the EEC, the flag is now strongly associated with the European Union so that it no longer serves the function of representing "Europe as a whole" at least since the early 2000s. 
The flag has notably been used by pro-EU protestors in the colour revolutions of the 2000s, e.g., in Belarus in 2004 by the pro-EU faction in the Euromaidan riots in Ukraine in 2013, and by the pro-EU faction in the Brexit campaigns of 2016.

Pan-European flags adopted before 1955

Prior to development of political institutions, flags representing Europe were limited to unification movements. The most popular were the European Movement's large green 'E' on a white background, and the "Pan European flag"  of the Paneuropean Union (1922).

See also

Brand EU
Captain Euro
CE marking
Charlemagne Prize
Estimated sign
Father-in-law of Europe
Founding fathers of the European Union

References

External links

 The symbols of the EU – Europa
 The European flag
 The European anthem
 Europe Day, 9 May
 United in diversity
 Council of Europe Logo and the European Flag – Council of Europe
 Why the European flag has been chosen: Resolution (55) 32 adopted by the Committee of Ministers of the Council of Europe (8 December 1955) – CVCE (Previously European NAvigator)
 The European Anthem and downloads – Council of Europe
 European anthem – CVCE (Previously European NAvigator)
 European commission poster – CVCE (Previously European NAvigator)
 The European emergency number 112 – European Emergency Number Association (EENA)
 The European emergency number 112 – European Commission
 Europe's name – A website on illustrations of Europa in relation to the Continent
 The Symbol's Role in the Creation of a European Identity – A dissertation paper.